Morotai Island is an island in the Halmahera group of eastern Indonesia's Maluku Islands (Moluccas).  It is one of Indonesia's northernmost islands.

Morotai is a rugged, forested island lying to the north of Halmahera. The island's largest town is Daruba, on the island's south coast. Leo Wattimena Airport is located on the island. Almost all of Morotai's numerous villages are coastal settlements; a paved road linking those on the east coast starts from Daruba and will eventually reach Berebere, the principal town on Morotai's east coast,  from Daruba.

History
Morotai was part of the Ternate Sultanate, which was a vassal of the Dutch East India Company by the end of the 17th century.

Second World War
The Empire of Japan invaded Morotai early in 1942 as part of its Dutch East Indies Campaign. US forces and their allies launched the Battle of Morotai in 1944; bombing the island in August and invading it in September. Imperial Japanese forces on Morotai held out until 1945 but failed to expel the Allied troops. In the latter part of 1944, 61,000 personnel landed on Morotai. Two thirds of them were engineers, who rapidly established facilities including harbors and two airstrips plus extensive fuel stores.

The formal surrender of the Second Japanese Army took place at Morotai on 9 September 1945.

The last confirmed Japanese holdout from the war, Private Teruo Nakamura (Amis: Attun Palalin), was discovered by the Indonesian Air Force on Morotai, and surrendered to a search patrol on December 18, 1974.

Permesta rebellion
The Dutch Empire withdrew in the Indonesian National Revolution in the late 1940s, after which the new Indonesian Air Force (AURI) kept one of the Allied-built airstrips in use. During the Permesta rebellion in 1958, AURI North American B-25 Mitchell bomber aircraft used the airstrip in transit on their way to attack the rebel center at Manado in North Sulawesi. Permesta had its own "Revolutionary Air Force", AUREV, whose aircraft, munitions and pilots were supplied by the CIA. AUREV aircraft attacked Morotai on April 21 and again early on April 26. The second air raid was immediately followed by an amphibious Permesta landing force that quickly captured the island. Within hours, a Douglas C-47 Skytrain transport aircraft landed on the now captured airstrip, carrying senior Permesta representative and two Americans. One was a USAF officer who inspected the runway and pronounced that Boeing B-29 Superfortress heavy bomber aircraft could use it.

In May 1958 Indonesian National Armed Forces started to gather amphibious forces to retake both Morotai and the rebel-held town of Jailolo on the neighboring island of Halmahera. By May 16 the assault fleet started to gather in Ambon harbour and on May 20 its troops landed on Morotai while élite Pasukan Gerak Tjepat (PGT or "Quick Reaction Force") troops parachuted onto the island. The Permesta force's surrender was as quick as its capture of the island less than a month before. It alarmed the Permesta rebels who had captured Jailolo, many of whom promptly fled back to North Sulawesi. Thereafter the rebellion was largely confined to the Minahasa Peninsula of Sulawesi, where Permesta remnants waged a guerilla campaign until the last unit surrendered in January 1962.

Spaceport plan
After assessing three potential spaceport sites in 2012, the national space agency LAPAN announced Morotai Island as a future spaceport site. Planning started in December 2012. The launch site's completion is expected in 2025. In 2013, LAPAN planned to launch an RX-550 experimental satellite launcher from a location in Morotai to be decided. This island was selected according to the following criteria:
Morotai Island's location near the equator, which makes the launch more economical.
The island has seven runways, one of them 2,400 meters, easily extended to 3,000 meters.
The ease of building on Morotai, which is not densely populated, and little potential for social conflict with native inhabitants.
Morotai Island's east side faces the Pacific Ocean directly, reducing downrange risks to other island populations.

Climate
Daruba, the main settlement and the seat of the regency has a tropical rainforest climate (Af) with moderate rainfall from August to October and heavy rainfall in the remaining months.

Notable people
Melky Goeslaw, singer and father of Melly Goeslaw

See also

Battle of Morotai
Islands of Indonesia

References

Sources

External links

Islands of the Maluku Islands
Landforms of North Maluku
Islands of the Pacific Ocean
Populated places in Indonesia
Islands of Indonesia